Kinan Racing Team is a Japanese UCI Continental cycling team established in 2015. Before registering as a UCI Continental team, the team was known as "Kinan AACA". The 2015 team featured three foreign riders, including Jai Crawford.

Team roster

Major wins 

2016
Overall Tour de Ijen, Jai Crawford
Stage 4 Tour de Ijen, Jai Crawford
Stage 3 Le Tour de Filipinas, Wesley Sulzberger
Stage 3 Tour de Singkarak, Ricardo Garcia Ambroa
2017
Overall Le Tour de Filipinas, Jai Crawford
Stage 7 Tour of Japan, Marcos Garcia
Stage 2 Tour de Kumano, Thomas Lebas
 Overall Tour de Flores, Thomas Lebas
Stage 6, Thomas Lebas
Overall Tour de Hokkaido, Marcos Garcia
Stage 3, Marcos Garcia
2018
Asian Continental U23 Road Race Championships, Masaki Yamamoto
Overall Sri Lanka T-Cup, Yasuharu Nakajima
Stage 1, Yasuharu Nakajima
Overall Tour of Japan, Marcos Garcia
Stage 5, Thomas Lebas
Stage 6, Marcos García
 National Road Championship, Genki Yamamoto
 U23 Time Trial, National Road Championships, Masaki Yamamoto
2019
Points classification Tour de Taiwan, Yasuharu Nakajima
Mountains classification Tour de Kumano, Marcos Garcia
Stage 2, Thomas Lebas
Overall Tour de Indonesia, Thomas Lebas
Stage 4 Tour de Ijen, Thomas Lebas
Overall Tour of Peninsular, Marcos García
Mountains classification, Marcos García
Stage 4, Marcos García
2022
Mountains classification Tour de Kumano, Masaki Yamamoto

References

External links
 

UCI Continental Teams (Asia)
Cycling teams established in 2015
Cycling teams based in Japan
2015 establishments in Japan